Wat Boston Buddha Vararam (Abbreviated BBVT) is a Thai Theravada Buddhist Temple or Wat located in Bedford, Massachusetts.  It is one of two Thai Buddhist Temples in Massachusetts, the other being Wat Nawamintararachutis.
The main community at Wat Boston includes primarily Cambodians, Thais and Laos communities, although they welcome all.

Wat Boston Buddha Vararam was started as a small house in Malden, Massachusetts by Phra Ajan Kitti, and moved to Bedford, Massachusetts in 1998 in search of more space.

References

External links
 Website

Asian-American culture in Massachusetts
Thai-American culture
Thai Theravada Buddhist temples and monasteries
Bedford, Massachusetts
Overseas Thai Buddhist temples
Buddhist temples in Massachusetts